Remigijus Pocius (born 21 March 1968) is a retired Lithuanian football forward, who last played for KFK Siauliai. He obtained a total number of seven caps for the Lithuania national football team, scoring one goal.

Honours
National Team
 Baltic Cup
 1991
 1992

References

1968 births
Living people
Soviet footballers
Lithuanian footballers
Lithuania international footballers
Association football forwards
FC Šiauliai players